Kauko Kustaa Helovirta (Hellström, 21 October 1924, Juupajoki – 13 September 1997, Helsinki, Finland) was a Finnish film actor.

Helovirta entered film in 1950 and made about 40 Finnish films between then and 1995.

Helovirta starred in the 1977 film alongside actor Antti Litja in Jäniksen vuosi a film about a Finnish man from Helsinki who leaves to find a new life in the wilderness.

Towards the end of his career in the mid 1990s he appeared on television.

Selected filmography

External links

1924 births
1997 deaths
People from Juupajoki
Finnish male film actors
Finnish male television actors
Finnish male voice actors
20th-century Finnish male actors
Deaths from cancer in Finland